Kamyshenka is the name of several rural localities in Russia:
Kamyshenka, Zavyalovsky District, Altai Krai, a selo in Zavyalovsky District
Kamyshenka, Amur Oblast, a selo in Zavyalovsky District